Luan Pereira dos Santos (born 11 September 1991) is a Brazilian footballer who plays as a forward for Chanthaburi.

Club career
He made his professional debut in the Campeonato Gaúcho for Juventude on 7 February 2010 in a game against Santa Cruz.

References

1991 births
Living people
Brazilian footballers
Esporte Clube Juventude players
Clube Esportivo Bento Gonçalves players
Esporte Clube Internacional players
Esporte Clube Avenida players
Anápolis Futebol Clube players
Boavista Sport Club players
C.F. União players
Hatta Club players
Al Hamriyah Club players
Leixões S.C. players
Brazilian expatriate footballers
Expatriate footballers in Portugal
Expatriate footballers in the United Arab Emirates
Liga Portugal 2 players
UAE First Division League players
Association football forwards